Lilium formosanum, also known as the Formosa lily or Taiwanese lily, is a plant species in the lily family, endemic to Taiwan. It is closely related to the Easter lily found in the Ryukyu Islands of Japan, eastern and northern Taiwan. Both species are cultivated for their showy, trumpet-shaped flowers. Lilium formosanum has become naturalized in scattered locations in Africa, Australia, and the Americas.

Varieties
Lilium formosanum var. formosanum
Lilium formosanum var. microphyllum T.S.Liu & S.S.Ying

Names
Several common names for the Taiwanese lily are in use among Taiwanese-speaking peoples. These include wild lily ( or ), trumpet flower, mountain garlic (or ), and master's flask ( or ). It is said the flower has another name of flower of broken bowl from the elderly members of the Hakka ethnic group. They believe that because the Taiwanese lily grows near bodies of clean water, harming the lily may damage the environment, just like breaking the bowls that people rely on. An alternative explanation is that parents convince children into not taking the lily by convincing the children that their dinner bowls may break if they destroy this flower.

See also 
 Wild Lily student movement

References

External links
Fine Gardening includes photos
Floridata includes photos
Invasive Species of South Africa includes photos

formosanum
Flora of Taiwan
Plants described in 1891
Garden plants of Asia